The 2015 season for the  cycling team began in February at the Clásica de Almería. The team participated in UCI Europe Tour races and UCI World Tour events when given a wildcard invitation.

2015 roster

Riders who joined the team for the 2015 season

Riders who left the team during or after the 2014 season

Season victories

National, Continental and World champions 2015

References

External links

 

2015 road cycling season by team
Cofidis (cycling team)
2015 in French sport